Otto Weiß (born 20 April 1914, date of death unknown) was a German pair skater. Weiß became German pair champion in 1932 and 1933 with partner Wally Hempel. Weiß represented Germany in the 1936 Winter Olympics with Eva Prawitz. In 1937 the pair became also German champions. In 1938 he competed with Gisela Grätz and placed 3rd at the German nationals.

Competitive highlights

Pairs skating career
(* with Wally Hempel, ** with Eva Prawitz, *** with Gisela Grätz)

References
 Otto Weiß' profile at Sports Reference.com

External links
 

1914 births
Year of death missing
German male pair skaters
Olympic figure skaters of Germany
Figure skaters at the 1936 Winter Olympics